Hélder José Oliveira Sá (born 10 November 2002) is a Portuguese professional footballer who plays for Vitória S.C. as a defender.

Club career
Born in Vila Nova de Famalicão, Sá played for two teams in his hometown before joining Vitória de Guimarães at the age of 12. In May 2020, he signed a three-year professional contract with a buyout clause of €30 million. The following 4 April, he made his debut in the Primeira Liga, playing all 90 minutes of a 2–1 loss at home to C.D. Tondela.

References

External links

2002 births
Living people
Portuguese footballers
Association football defenders
Primeira Liga players
Vitória S.C. players
People from Vila Nova de Famalicão
Portugal youth international footballers
Sportspeople from Braga District